Clogher Valley Fault is a geological fault in County Fermanagh, Northern Ireland. The focus of deformation during the Variscan Orogenic Cycle in Northern Ireland was located on, and between, two major faults. In the north is the northern-bounding fault of the Midland Valley Terrane, the Castle Archdale Fault-Omagh Thrust Fault zone, while in the south is the Clogher Valley Fault. Carboniferous rocks located between these faults were affected by strike-slip, associated with intermittent dextral transpression and transtension. Between the Clogher Valley Fault and the Southern Upland Fault, the southern bounding fault of the Midland Valley Terrane, the Carboniferous rocks are relatively undeformed.

See also
List of geological faults in Northern Ireland

References

 Map sheet 44 (and accompanying memoir) of the series of 1:50,000 scale geological maps of Northern Ireland published by Geological Survey of Northern Ireland. 
 Lyle, P. 2003 Classic geology in Europe 5 The north of Ireland Terra Publishing, Harpenden

Seismic faults of Northern Ireland
Geography of County Fermanagh